Heather Matson is an American politician. She is a Democrat representing District 42 in the Iowa House of Representatives. She also served a non-continuous term from 2019 to 2021.

Political career
In 2016, Matson challenged Republican incumbent Kevin Koester for the 38th district seat in the Iowa House of Representatives, but lost. In 2018, she ran again, and won. She ran for a second term in 2020.

As of June 2020, Matson sat on the following House committees:
 Economic Growth
 Education
 Environmental Protection
 Human Resources
 Economic Development Appropriations Subcommittee

Electoral record

References 

Democratic Party members of the Iowa House of Representatives
Women state legislators in Iowa
Living people
Year of birth missing (living people)
21st-century American politicians
21st-century American women politicians